Mathew Quinn (born 17 April 1976 in Salisbury, Rhodesia) was a South African sprinter. Together with Morné Nagel, Corné du Plessis and Lee-Roy Newton he won a gold medal in 4 x 100 metres relay at the 2001 World Championships in Athletics.

Following the ruling of 13 December 2005 which retroactively disqualified Tim Montgomery and henceforth the American team, the South African team were promoted to gold medallists.

He is married to former sprinter Heide Seyerling.

Personal bests
100 metres – 10.08 (1999)
200 metres – 20.93 (1999)

External links 
 
 
 

1976 births
White Rhodesian people
Zimbabwean people of British descent
Zimbabwean emigrants to South Africa
South African male sprinters
Living people
Athletes (track and field) at the 2000 Summer Olympics
Olympic athletes of South Africa
Sportspeople from Harare
World Athletics Championships medalists
World Athletics Championships athletes for South Africa
Universiade medalists in athletics (track and field)
Universiade bronze medalists for South Africa
World Athletics Championships winners
Medalists at the 1999 Summer Universiade